Alisma subcordatum, the American water plantain, is a perennial aquatic plant in the water-plantain family (Alismataceae). Any leaves that form underwater are weak and quick to rot; they rarely remain on adult plants. A branched inflorescence with white to pink 3-petaled flowers blooms from June to September. The seeds are eaten by waterfowl and upland birds. Native Americans dried and ate the submerged rootlike structures. The species name subcordatum means "almost heart-shaped".

Distribution and habitat
American water plantain is native to most of eastern and central United States and Canada from Texas to Georgia, north to Manitoba and New Brunswick, though it has not been reported from Florida.  It grows in the mud of still to slow moving water, seeps, and wetlands.

References

subcordatum
Freshwater plants
Plants described in 1808
Flora of Eastern Canada
Flora of the United States
Taxa named by Constantine Samuel Rafinesque